SM UB-71 was a German Type UB III submarine or U-boat in the German Imperial Navy during World War I. She was commissioned into the German Imperial Navy on 23 November 1917 as SM UB-71.

Construction

She was built by Friedrich Krupp Germaniawerft of Kiel and following just under a year of construction, launched at Kiel on 12 July 1917. UB-71 was commissioned later that same year under the command of Kptlt. Kurt Schapler. Like all Type UB III submarines, UB-71 carried 10 torpedoes and was armed with a  deck gun. UB-71 had a displacement of  while surfaced and  when submerged. Her engines enabled her to travel at  when surfaced and  when submerged.

References

Notes

Citations

Bibliography 

 

German Type UB III submarines
World War I submarines of Germany
U-boats commissioned in 1917
1917 ships
Ships built in Kiel
Maritime incidents in 1918
U-boats sunk in 1918
World War I shipwrecks in the Mediterranean Sea
U-boats sunk by depth charges
U-boats sunk by British warships
Ships lost with all hands